Desensitized is the second studio album by American rock band Drowning Pool. It was their first album since the death of vocalist Dave Williams as well as the only album to feature replacement vocalist Jason Jones. The album debuted at number 17 on the Billboard 200 chart.

The album cover features porn star Jesse Jane. Desensitized shows less nu metal elements than Drowning Pool's previous album, Sinner.

Jones left the band soon after the album's release because of personal and musical differences. "Step Up", "Think" and "Hate" are songs from Desensitized that are played during live performances today. "Step Up" was featured in the 2004 film The Punisher and was the theme song for WWE's WrestleMania XX. It was also featured in the compilation album MTV2 Headbangers Ball, Vol. 2.

Writing and recording
Writing for the album began in 2003. Recording began towards the end of the year and was finished in March 2004.

Jason Jones said most of his songs are about the struggle when he was living as a homeless man "People were like, 'Look at this fucking homeless guy,'" "It's a struggle, man, and a lot of my songs are about the struggle."

Of "Cast Me Aside", Jason Jones remarked: "You get a rash of calls from people you haven't heard from in 10-12 years who are suddenly wanting to kick it again. I was like "Where the fuck were you?" You know... that whole shit of everyone loves you when you're on top kinda thing."

Track listing

Personnel
Drowning Pool
 Stevie Benton – bass
 Jason Jones – vocals
 Mike Luce – drums
 C. J. Pierce – guitar

Production
 Produced and recorded by Johnny K
 Mixed by Randy Staub
 Additional engineering by Tadpole and James Murray
 Assistant engineer at Groovemaster Recording: James Winans
 Assistant engineers at Ocean Studios: Jason Cupp and Alex Pavlides
 Assistant engineer at Armoury Studios: Misha Rajaratnam
 Guitar tech: Tony McQuaid
 Recorded at Groovemaster Recording in Chicago, Illinois, and Ocean Studios in Burbank, California
 Mixed at Armoury Studios in Vancouver, Canada
 Mastered by Tom Baker at Precision Mastering in Hollywood, California
 Demos / Pre-production by Ben Schigel at Last Beat Studios in Dallas, Texas
 Band photos: Clay Patrick McBride
 Cover star: Jesse Jane
 Art direction: Ed Sherman

Charts

Album

References

Drowning Pool albums
2004 albums
Wind-up Records albums